Vanquisher (aka Final Target; , Suay Samurai (Beautiful Samurai)) is a 2009 Thai science fiction/action film. The film was released on November 5, 2009.

Plot 
Kunja, a beautiful agent of the CIA SAD, has just completed an Undercover operation in southern Thailand. Then she finds herself the target of an assassination attempt undertaken by her own organization.
the CIA agent Gunja is forced to fight against agents who have been ordered to take her out at all costs. She survives and, after two years of staying low, reappears in Bangkok to confront her old enemies and thwart a plot to detonate a bomb in the city. She manages to survive and decides to take revenge.

Cast 
 Sophita Sriban as Kunja
 Nui Ketsarin as Sirin
  as Claire
  as Mazaru
 Sarunyoo Wongkrachang as Wayib

Originally, the film featured four Thai femme fatales, but executive producer  ordered all scenes with “Amy” Chotiros Suriyawong scrubbed from the film after she had sparked condemnation by wearing a scandalously revealing dress during the 2007 Thailand National Film Association Awards.

Reception 

The film has drawn sharp criticism.

References

External links
 
 
 
 Synopsis from fan.tv
  

2009 science fiction action films
2009 films
Thai science fiction films
Thai-language films
Thai martial arts films
Thai science fiction action films
2009 martial arts films
Martial arts science fiction films